Shods is a neighborhood in Alexandria, Egypt. The neighborhood was originally named Schutz after a wealthy Dutch-Egyptian landowner who lived in the area in the early 20th century, but it was later Arabized to Shods.

See also 
 Neighborhoods in Alexandria

Populated places in Alexandria Governorate
Neighbourhoods of Alexandria